Egress Software Technologies Ltd is a UK-based software company providing security software for e-mail, secure messaging, Document and Email Classification, and associated technologies to assist secure file sharing and handling.

History 
Egress was founded in 2007 by Tony Pepper, Neil Larkins and John Goodyear.  In 2011 Egress was awarded the
Security Innovation of the Year at the British Computer Society UK IT Industry Awards. The company experienced an influx of customers following the introduction of the European Union’s General Data Protection Regulation in 2018.

In June, 2021, Egress acquired Aquilai Ltd. for an undisclosed price.

Products

Egress software is for the secure transfer of emails and documents to non-secure email addresses.

Product certification and Agency approved listings 
In October 2013, Egress Switch was certified by CESG against Desktop and Gateway Email Encryption Security Characteristics as part of their Commercial Product Assurance program. Egress Protect is certified by the UK's NCSC to handle Official and  Official Sensitive under the UK government security classifications policy.  this certification lies with National Cyber Security Centre (NCSC) and eas extended until 20 December 2019.

In May 2014, Egress Switch encryption services became available to procure via the G-Cloud 5 Framework, the UK Government's program committed to the adoption of Cloud services across the Public Sector. Through the G-Cloud Framework, Public Sector organizations are able to procure the following Egress Switch services: Switch Secure Email, Switch Secure File Transfer and Switch Secure Web Form via a number of Egress value added resellers.

Also in May 2014, Egress Switch Secure Email was listed in the NATO Information Assurance Product Catalogue, which provides the 28 NATO nations, as well as their civil and military bodies, with a directory of Information Assurance products, protection profiles and packages that are in use or available for procurement to meet operational requirements.

References

External links

Companies based in the London Borough of Islington
Computer security software companies
Software companies of the United Kingdom